Gymnastik- och Idrottsföreningen Sundsvall, more commonly known as GIF Sundsvall, Giffarna  or simply Sundsvall, is a Swedish professional football club based in Sundsvall. The club is affiliated with Medelpads Fotbollförbund and plays its home games at NP3 Arena with a capacity of roughly 8 000 spectators. Formed on 25 August 1903, the club has played 19 seasons in Sweden's highest football league Allsvenskan, the club's first season in the league was in 1965.

GIF Sundsvall is placed twenty-second in the overall Allsvenskan table maratontabellen. The club colours, reflected in their crest and kit, are blue, yellow and white. Nevertheless, white is not articulately present in today's kit it has a strong history within the club.

History 

The club was formed on August 25, 1903, at Matilda Anderssons Café. At that time, GIF Sundsvall stood for "Godtemplarnas Idrotts Förening Sundsvall" which mainly was for Teetotallers up until the alcohol demands was lightened in 1920. The initials then came to stand for, to this day still, "Gymnastik och Idrottsföreningen Sundsvall" (Gymnastics and sports club Sundsvall).

The club reached the first tier of the domestic football in 1965. The club has since been a "yo-yo team" mainly playing in the second division but with Allsvenskan stints in 1975, 1987–89, 1991, 2000–06, 2008, 2012 and 2015–19.

GIF Sundsvall earlier had women's football, bandy and ice hockey on the program. The bandy team became district champions for Västernorrland in 1921. The hockey team folded in the late 1960s. In 1985 the women's team was transferred to Sundsvalls DFF. This mainly because the women's team was disappointed with the lack of support from the men's team.

Stadium 

GIF Sundsvall's home stadium is NP3 Arena, formerly known as Idrottsparken and  Norrporten Arena. It is located in the heart of Sundsvall and was inaugurated on August 6, 1903. It was renovated in 2001–2002 and it can now hold a capacity of 8,000, with 5,000 under roof.

Between 2006 – 2016 the name was changed to Norrporten Arena and during 2017 the club expect to present a new sponsor and name of the stadium. The stadium's grass is artificial turf since 2004.

The record attendance was 16,507 against Högadals IS on October 15, 1961.

Supporters 
The official supporter's club of GIF Sundsvall is called Patronerna. Formed in 1999, mostly as a joke by some friends supporting their friend, the club has in a short period of time amassed a strong reputation. The name is mainly a historical reference to the sawmill owners who were very powerful in Sundsvall during the post-industrial-revolution era. In 2005, FP-tifo, the group who designs the club's terrace choreography, won the Swedish tifo awards arranged by Canal+.

Achievements 
 Superettan:
 Runners-up (3): 2011, 2014, 2021
 Division 1 Norra:
 Winners (2): 1990, 1999
 Norrländska Mästerskapet:
 Winners (1): 1942
 Runners-up (2): 1928, 1951

Players

First-team squad

Out on loan

Retired numbers 
10 – Leif Forsberg, forward (1980–1988, 1990–2001)

Managers 
 Stig Sundqvist (1955–58)
 Jimmy Meadows (1976)
 Anders Grönhagen (1986–89)
 Jan Mattsson (1990–92)
 Anders Grönhagen (1999–01)
 Per Joar Hansen (2002–03)
 Patrick Walker (2002–04)
 Rikard Norling (Jan 2004 – Dec 2004)
 Jan Halvor Halvorsen (Jan 2005 – Aug 2005)
 Anders Högman (2005)
 David Wilson (July 2005 – July 2006)
 Mika Sankala (2006–07), (2008–Ass.)
 Per Joar Hansen (Jan 2008 – Oct 2008)
 Sören Åkeby (Oct 2008 – Nov 2012)
 Joel Cedergren (Nov 2012 – Aug 2019) & Roger Franzén (Nov 2012 – Sep 2016)
 Tony Gustavsson (Aug 2019 – Dec 2019)
 Henrik Åhnstrand (Dec 2019–July 2022)
 Brian Clarhaut (July 2022–December 2022)
 Douglas Jakobsen (January 2023–)

Footnotes

References

External links 

 Allsvenskan (Premier league) – Official site
 GIF Sundsvall – Official site
 Patronerna – Official supporter club site
 Superettan (Second tier league) – Official site

 
Allsvenskan clubs
Sport in Sundsvall
Football clubs in Västernorrland County
Association football clubs established in 1903
Bandy clubs established in 1903
Ice hockey clubs established in 1903
1903 establishments in Sweden
Defunct bandy clubs in Sweden
Defunct ice hockey teams in Sweden